Elizabeth Grace Hay (born October 22, 1951) is a Canadian novelist and short story writer.

Her 2007 novel Late Nights on Air won the Giller Prize. Her first novel A Student of Weather (2000) was a finalist for the Giller Prize and won the CAA MOSAID Technologies Award for Fiction and the TORGI Award. She has been a finalist for the Governor General's Award twice, for her short-story collection Small Change in 1997 and her novel Garbo Laughs in 2003. His Whole Life (2015) was shortlisted for the Rogers Writers' Trust Fiction Prize. Hay's memoir about the last years of her parents' lives, All Things Consoled, won the 2018 Hilary Weston Writers' Trust Prize for Nonfiction.

In 2002, she received the Marian Engel Award, presented by the Writers' Trust of Canada to an established female writer for her body of work — including novels, short fiction, and creative non-fiction.

Life
Hay was born on October 22, 1951 in Owen Sound, Ontario. She is the daughter of a high school principal and a painter. She spent a year in England when she was fifteen and later attended the University of Toronto.

In September, 1972, she quit university and a few months later travelled out west by train. The following year she returned to Toronto and finished her degree in English and Philosophy. In 1974 she moved to Yellowknife, NWT. She worked for ten years as a CBC radio broadcaster in Yellowknife, Winnipeg and Toronto and then moved to Mexico, where she freelanced for the CBC. In 1986 she settled in New York City, and then returned to Canada in 1992 with her family. She lives in Ottawa with her husband Mark Fried, a literary translator. She has two children: a son, Ben, and a daughter, Sochi.

Critical reputation and style
In an interview with the CBC in 2007, Hay commented on the relationship between her writing and her career in radio. "When I worked in Yellowknife," she said, "I was writing poetry and stories on the side and not getting very far. I felt kind of schizophrenic, like my radio work was one type of thing and my writing was another and there was a gap between. That became even more pronounced when I started working for CBC's Sunday Morning, doing radio documentaries. I took me a while to realize that there didn't need to be such a wide gap between those two forms of writing, and that they could cross-fertilize. Good radio writing is similar to any good writing. It's direct and economical and intimate and full of detail. Also, it sets your visual imagination working."

Bibliography

Novels
 A Student of Weather (2000) McClelland & Stewart 
 Garbo Laughs (2003) McClelland & Stewart
 Late Nights on Air (2007) McClelland & Stewart
 Alone in the Classroom (2011) McClelland & Stewart
 His Whole Life (2015) McClelland & Stewart

Short Story Collections
 Small Change (1997) The Porcupine's Quill (republished by McClelland & Stewart in 2000)

Short stories
"The Friend" (in The Penguin Book of Canadian Short Stories, edited by Jane Urquhart, 2007, Penguin Canada)
"Jet in England", Ottawa Magazine summer fiction issue, Jul/Aug 2007
"The Food of Love", Ottawa Citizen, Holiday Edition, 2008
"Of Mattresses and Men", Ottawa Magazine summer fiction issue, July/Aug 2008
"Last Poems", The New Quarterly, Spring 2009
"City as Redhead", The New Quarterly, Spring 2009

Non-fiction
 A non-fiction trilogy about Elizabeth Hay's travels outside of Canada: 
 Crossing the Snow Line (1989) Black Moss Press
 The Only Snow in Havana (1992) Cormorant Books
 Captivity Tales: Canadians in New York (1993) New Star Books
 All Things Consoled: a daughter's memoir (2018) McClelland & Stewart

Essays
"Ten Beauty Tips You Never Asked For" (in Dropped Threads 2, edited by Carol Shields and Marjorie Anderson, 2003, Vintage Canada)
"The Most Fearless Book I Read" (in The Book I Read, edited by Peder Zane, 2004, Norton)
"My Debt to D.H. Lawrence" (in Writing Life: Celebrated Canadian and International Authors on Writing and Life, edited by Constance Rooke, 2006, McClelland & Stewart)
"Between Books" (in Finding the Words: Writers on Inspiration, Desire, War, Celebrity, Exile, and Breaking the Rules, edited by Jared Bland, 2011, McClelland & Stewart)
"The Mother as Material" (in The Cambridge Companion to Alice Munro, edited by David Staines, 2016, Cambridge UP)

Anthologies
Short Fiction, an Anthology, edited by Rosemary Sullivan and Mark Levene, Oxford University Press, 2003
The Scotiabank Giller Prize 15 Years: An Anthology of Prize-Winning Canadian Fiction, Penguin, 2008
Best Canadian Essays 2010, Tightrope Books, 2010

Prizes and honours
1993 Co-Winner, Edna Staebler Award for Creative Non-Fiction (for The Only Snow in Havana)
1997 Finalist, Governor General's Award for Fiction (for Small Change)
1997 Finalist, Rogers Communication Writers' Trust Fiction Prize (for Small Change)
1997 Finalist, Trillium Book Award (for Small Change)
2000 CAA MOSAID Technologies Award for Fiction
2000 Finalist, Giller Prize (for A Student of Weather)
2000 Finalist, Ottawa Book Award (for A Student of Weather)
2000 TORGI Award
2002 Marian Engel Award (Writers' Trust of Canada)
2003 Finalist, Governor-General's Award for Fiction (for A Student of Weather)
2003 Ottawa Book Award (for Garbo Laughs)
2007 Giller Prize (for Late Nights on Air)
2009 Nominated, IMPAC Dublin Literary Award
2012 Diamond Jubilee Medal
2015 Finalist, Rogers Writers' Trust Fiction Prize
2015 Finalist, Ottawa Book Award
2018 Hilary Weston Writers' Trust Prize for Nonfiction (for All Things Consoled)

References

1951 births
Living people
Canadian non-fiction writers
Canadian women non-fiction writers
Canadian women novelists
Canadian women short story writers
People from Owen Sound
Writers from Ontario
20th-century Canadian novelists
20th-century Canadian short story writers
20th-century Canadian women writers
21st-century Canadian novelists
21st-century Canadian short story writers
21st-century Canadian women writers